An Innocent Man is the ninth studio album by American singer-songwriter Billy Joel, released on August 8, 1983. The concept album is a tribute to the American popular music of Joel's adolescent years with Joel paying homage to a number of different and popular American musical styles from the late 1950s and early 1960s, most notably doo-wop and soul music. The album cover artwork was taken on the front steps of 142 Mercer Street, just north of the intersection of Mercer and Prince Street in the SoHo neighborhood of Manhattan, New York City.

Background
In an interview about the making of the album, Joel talks about the fact that at the time that he was recording An Innocent Man, he was newly divorced from his first wife, Elizabeth Weber, and was single for the first time since achieving rock star status. He had the opportunity to date supermodels such as Elle Macpherson and Christie Brinkley, and because of these experiences, he said, "I kind of felt like a teenager all over again." Joel started writing songs in the same styles as pop songs that he remembered from his teenage years, citing pop music from the late 1950s and early 1960s, including "early R&B songs and The Four Seasons, and the Motown music, soul music." According to Joel, the various songs were not meant to be autobiographical, and instead center around various made-up characters.

Joel explained, "When you're gonna write [songs for a new album], you write what you're feeling. And I didn't fight it. The material was coming so easily and so quickly, and I was having so much fun doing it. I was kind of reliving my youth. ... I think within 6 weeks I had written most of the material on the album." Joel also said that he was pleasantly surprised to have hit records in the 1980s with retro songs like the mostly a cappella doo wop song "The Longest Time." The song "Easy Money", which was made as a tribute to early R&B, was initially written for the 1983 film of the same name starring Rodney Dangerfield, and was the song that "kicked off" the creation of An Innocent Man, according to Joel. Dangerfield later made a cameo appearance at the end of the music video for the song "Tell Her About It", as an exchange for Joel's song in support of Dangerfield's movie.  The song "Christie Lee" describes a narrative about a saxophone player who has his heart broken by a woman he falls in love with, whom he later realizes is only interested in him for his saxophone skills.

Chart performance
The album featured three Billboard Top 10 hit singles: "Tell Her About It" (No. 1), "Uptown Girl" (No. 3) and "An Innocent Man" (No. 10). Four other singles were released from the album: "The Longest Time" (No. 14), "Leave a Tender Moment Alone" (No. 27), "Keeping the Faith" (No. 18) and "This Night" (US B-side of "Leave a Tender Moment Alone"). "Tell Her About It" and "Uptown Girl" garnered international success—"Uptown Girl" reached No. 1 in the UK, Australia and New Zealand. An Innocent Man remained on the US Pop album chart for 111 weeks, becoming Joel's longest charting studio album behind The Stranger. For over a year, the album remained on the charts in the UK, Japan and Australia.

Critical reception

Like his three previous efforts, Joel's An Innocent Man received a nomination for the 26th Grammy Award for Album of the Year, although the award went to Michael Jackson's Thriller. The album was also nominated for a Grammy for Best Male Pop Vocal Performance for "Uptown Girl," but again was beaten by Thriller.

Track listing
All songs by Billy Joel, except for the chorus for "This Night," which is credited on the sleeve to L. v. Beethoven.

The track listing on the LP is slightly different from that on the cassette and original CD pressings, with the latter swapping the places of "The Longest Time" and "Uptown Girl." However, on the actual cassette shell and disc label, the songs are listed (and play) in the correct order as printed on the LP.

Personnel
 Billy Joel – Baldwin SF-10 acoustic piano, Fender Rhodes electric piano, Hammond B3 organ, lead and background vocals
 Liberty DeVitto – drums
 Doug Stegmeyer – bass guitar
 David Brown – lead electric and acoustic guitars
 Russell Javors – rhythm electric and acoustic guitars
 Mark Rivera – alto saxophone on "Keeping the Faith", "This Night" and "Christie Lee"; tenor saxophone, percussion, backing vocals

Additional personnel
 Ralph MacDonald – percussion on "Leave a Tender Moment Alone" and "Careless Talk"
 Leon Pendarvis – Hammond B3 organ on "Easy Money"
 Richard Tee – acoustic piano on "Tell Her About It"
 Eric Gale – electric guitar on "Easy Money"
 Toots Thielemans – harmonica on "Leave a Tender Moment Alone"
 "String Fever" – strings
 Ronnie Cuber – baritone saxophone on "Easy Money", "Careless Talk", "Tell Her About It" and "Keeping the Faith"
 Jon Faddis – trumpet on "Easy Money"
 David Sanborn – alto saxophone on "Easy Money"
 Joe Shepley – trumpet on "Easy Money", "Careless Talk", "Tell Her About It" and "Keeping the Faith"
 Michael Brecker – tenor saxophone on "Careless Talk", "Tell Her About It" and "Keeping the Faith"
 John Gatchell – trumpet on "Careless Talk", "Tell Her About It" and "Keeping the Faith"
 Tom Bahler – background vocals
 Rory Dodd – background vocals
 Frank Floyd – background vocals
 Lani Groves – background vocals
 Ullanda McCullough – background vocals
 Ron Taylor – background vocals
 Terry Textor – background vocals
 Eric Troyer – background vocals
 Mike Alexander – background vocals

Production 
 Producer – Phil Ramone
 Engineers – Jim Boyer and Bradshaw Leigh
 Assistant Engineers – Mike Allaire and Scott James
 Production Coordinator – Laura Loncteaux
 Mastered by Ted Jensen
 Horn and String arrangements – David Matthews
 Background vocal arrangements – Tom Bahler
 Musical Advisor – Billy Zampino
 Photography – Gilles Larrain
 Cover Design – Christopher Austopchuk and Mark Larson
Studios
 Recorded at Chelsea Sound and A & R Recording, Inc., New York, NY.
 Mixed at A & R Recording, Inc., New York, NY.
 Mastered at Sterling Sound, New York, NY.

Accolades

Grammy Awards

|-
| width="35" align="center" rowspan="2"|1984 || An Innocent Man || Album of the Year || 
|-
|"Uptown Girl" || | Best Pop Vocal Performance – Male ||

American Music Awards

|-
|  style="width:35px; text-align:center;" rowspan="2"|1983 || Billy Joel (performer) || Favorite Pop/Rock Male Artist|| 
|-
| "Tell Her About It" || Favorite Pop/Rock Video || 
|-

Charts

Weekly charts

Year-end charts

Decade-end charts

Certifications

References

Bibliography

 

Billy Joel albums
1983 albums
Albums produced by Phil Ramone
Columbia Records albums
Concept albums